David Snowden (February 11, 1898 – March 14, 1992) was an American Negro league pitcher in the 1930s.

A native of Bunkie, Louisiana, Snowden played for the Detroit Stars in 1933. In seven recorded games on the mound, he posted a 6.39 ERA over 38 innings. Snowden died in Port Arthur, Texas in 1992 at age 94.

References

External links
 and Seamheads

1898 births
1992 deaths
Indianapolis ABCs (1931–1933) players
People from Bunkie, Louisiana
Baseball pitchers
Baseball players from Louisiana
20th-century African-American sportspeople